Dub Thompson is an American indie rock music duo consisting of Matt Pulos and Evan Laffer, originating from Agoura Hills, California. The duo plays a style of post-punk, post-rock, punk rock, alternative rock style experimental rock music. Dub Thompson was established in 2014, while they released a studio album, 9 Songs (2014), with Dead Oceans.

Background
Matt Pulos, vocalist and guitarist, and Evan Laffer, drummer, become friends while attending Agoura High School in Agoura Hills, California. Their band was originally named Wolf Thompson after the Vice Principal of Lindero Canyon Middle School.

Music history
The duo commenced as a musical entity in 2014, with releasing a studio album, 9 Songs, on June 10, 2014, with Dead Oceans. This album got a Metascore of a 70 from seven ratings.

Members
Current members
 Matthew David "Matt" Pulos (born June 24, 1995) – vocals, guitars
 Evan Benjamin Laffer (born November 30, 1994) – drums

Discography
Studio albums
 9 Songs (June 10, 2014, Dead Oceans)

References

External links
 

Musical groups from California
2014 establishments in California
Musical groups established in 2014
Dead Oceans artists